Au Tabor is a coastal town in Anse la Ray District, Saint Lucia. Tt is located on the western coast at the Caribbean Sea, just above the town of Anse La Raye.

The second order administrative divisions of Au Tabor and Au Tabor Hill have populations of 451 and 78, respectively.

See also
List of cities in Saint Lucia

References

Populated coastal places in Saint Lucia
Towns in Saint Lucia